USS General H. L. Scott (AP-136) was a  for the U.S. Navy in World War II. The ship was crewed by the U.S. Coast Guard until decommissioning. She was named in honor of U.S. Army general Hugh Lenox Scott. She was sold in 1965 for commercial operation under the name SS Yorkmar, before being scrapped in 1974.

Operational history
General H. L. Scott (AP-136) was laid down 20 December 1942 under a Maritime Commission contract (MC #659) by Kaiser Co., Inc., Yard 3, Richmond, California; launched 19 September 1943; sponsored by Mrs. Walter K. Wilson; acquired by the Navy 6 March 1944; and commissioned 3 April at San Francisco.

After shakedown off San Diego, General H. L. Scott departed San Francisco 5 May with reinforcement troops embarked for the South Pacific. Arriving Nouméa, New Caledonia, 21 May, she returned to San Francisco 7 June to continue transporting men and supplies to island bases in the Pacific. As American naval power drove nearer to the heart of the Japanese Empire, she made six voyages to the western Pacific between 10 June 1944 and 2 July 1945, carrying her passengers and cargo out of San Francisco to the Marshalls, the New Hebrides, New Caledonia, New Guinea, the Admiralties, and the Philippines. In addition, she operated for a time in the western Pacific as Pacific Fleet receiving ship.

General H. L. Scott departed San Francisco 7 July for New York, where she arrived 21 July. She sailed 3 August for the Mediterranean and embarked veteran troops at Naples and Leghorn, Italy, before returning to Boston 27 August. Between 2 September and October, she steamed via the Suez Canal to Calcutta, India, and Colombo, Ceylon, on "Magic-Carpet" duty to transport troops back to the United States. She arrived New York 28 October, sailed 10 November for China, and arrived Shanghai 11 December to support Nationalist forces during the protracted struggle for control of the Chinese mainland.

General H. L. Scott returned to Seattle 30 December. On 5 February 1946 she sailed for the Far East with occupation troops embarked. After touching at Jinsen, Korea, and Shanghai, she returned to Seattle 20 March. She decommissioned 29 May and was returned to WSA 3 June.

She entered the National Defense Fleet and was berthed in Puget Sound until sold to Bethlehem Steel Corp. 31 July 1964. She was converted to a general cargo ship in 1965 for Bethlehem's subsidiary Calmar Line and operated under the name SS Yorkmar, USCG ON 294261, until scrapped in 1974.

References

Sources

External links

 
 Interview with Clyde Allen, USCG (Ret.), a World War II veteran interviewed as part of the U.S. Coast Guard Oral History Program

H. L. Scott
Ships built in Richmond, California
1943 ships
Olympia Reserve Fleet